Reeve Maclaren Bailey (born May 2, 1911, in Fairmont, West Virginia - died July 2, 2011, in Ann Arbor, Michigan) was an American ichthyologist.

Bailey was awarded Doctor of Philosophy degree from the University of Michigan in 1938. Bailey was the President of the American Fisheries Society in 1974–1975.

References

1911 births
2011 deaths
American ichthyologists
American centenarians
Men centenarians
University of Michigan alumni
People from Fairmont, West Virginia